The Stranglers of Bombay is a 1959 British adventure horror film directed by Terence Fisher for Hammer Films dealing with the British East India Company's investigation of the cult of Thuggee stranglers in the 1830s. The film stars Guy Rolfe, Allan Cuthbertson and Andrew Cruickshank.

Plot
Captain Harry Lewis of the British East India Company is investigating why over 2,000 natives are missing, but encounters a deaf ear from his superior, Colonel Henderson, who is more concerned with the local merchants' caravans which are disappearing without a trace. To appease them, Henderson agrees to appoint a man to investigate, and Lewis believes it will be him. However, he is sorely disappointed when Henderson gives the job to the newly arrived, oblivious Captain Connaught-Smith, the son of an old friend of Henderson's.

Lewis believes an organized gang is murdering both the men and animals of the caravans and then burying the bodies, and suspects that the culprits have secret informants among the merchants of the city. He presents Connaught-Smith with his evidence and his theories, but is dismissed. He is also later caught by the Thugees and sentenced to die by the bite of a cobra, but is rescued by a pet mongoose, forcing the cult's high priest to release him. However, Connaught-Smith remains antagonistic and derisive towards Lewis, who eventually resigns his commission in frustration to investigate on his own.

Ram Das, Lewis' houseboy, believes he has seen his brother, Gopali, who disappeared some years ago, and receives permission to search for him. Lewis later learns that Ram Das has been captured by the Thugs when his severed hand is tossed through the window of his bungalow; soon after, the Thugs compel Gopali Das, a new initiate of the cult, to kill his brother. Meanwhile, the merchants decide to band together and create a super-caravan whose size, as they believe, will discourage the bandits. The hidebound Captain Connaught-Smith leads the caravan and foolishly allows the stranglers (in the guise of travellers) to join them. That night, the Thugs strike with their usual success, and all caravan members, Connaught-Smith included, end up slain and buried.

Lewis and Lt. Silver, a cult member, investigate the caravan's disappearance. Lewis sees the scar that marks Silver as a Thuggee follower of Kali and shoots him in self-defence. Lewis then discovers the buried bodies and returns to the cult's secret temple, where he is caught and set to die on a burning pyre. Gopali Das, however, now haunted by his brother's death at his own hands, frees Lewis, who casts the high priest onto the pyre instead, and the two men escape in the ensuing tumult. Lewis and Gopali race to meet Henderson, who is dining with Patel Shari, the merchants' local representative and secretly a member and informer of the Thugee cult. Gopali identifies Patel's chief servant as a Thug; Patel kills his follower to hold his tongue, but exposes himself with this action. Following this, Lewis' resignation is revoked, and he receives a promotion from Henderson for his help in exposing the Thuggee cult. The film ends with a narrative display detailing that the Thugee cult was subsequently wiped out by the British, and a quotation by Major General William Sleeman: "If we have done nothing else for India, we have done this one good thing."

Cast
 Guy Rolfe as Captain Harry Lewis
 Allan Cuthbertson as Capt. Christopher Connaught-Smuth
 Andrew Cruickshank as Col. Henderson
 George Pastell as High Priest of Kali 
 Marne Maitland as Patel Shari
 Jan Holden as Mart Lewis
 Paul Stassino as Lt. Silver
 Tutte Lemkow as Ram Das
 Roger Delgado as Bundar (uncredited)
 Marie Devereux as Karim (uncredited)
 Margaret Gordon as Mrs Flood (uncredited)
 John Harvey as Burns (uncredited)
 Jack McNaughton as Corporal Roberts (uncredited)
 Warren Mitchell as Merchant (uncredited)
 Michael Nightingale as Sidney Flood (uncredited)
 Steven Scott as Walters (uncredited)
 David Spenser as Gopali Das (uncredited)

Historical accuracy 
Stranglers of Bombay is somewhat historically accurate in describing the religious cult of Kali and the actions of the Thugs (also known as thaga, pronounced "tahg"). Using modern methods, the British succeeded in wiping out the cult, which had originated as far back as the 6th Century.

See also
 The Terror of the Tongs, a quasi-remake by Hammer from 1961

References

External links

 
 

1959 films
British historical adventure films
Hammer Film Productions films
Films directed by Terence Fisher
Films scored by James Bernard
Films set in the British Raj
Films set in Mumbai
1950s historical adventure films
Films about cults
1950s English-language films
1950s British films